Franklin Bama Yangoua or Francisco Obama Ondo (born 9 September 1996, 15 May 1996 or 10 November 1996) is a naturalized Equatoguinean professional footballer originally from Cameroon. He is playing for AS Vita Club in DR Congo.

After winning the Equatoguinean Primera División in 2013, he competed for Akonangui FC at the 2014 CAF Champions League in February 2014. On 4 May 2014, he was called up to the Equatorial Guinea national team for two 2015 Africa Cup of Nations qualifying matches against Mauritania. So far, he was known as Franklin Bama Yangoua, his date of birth being 9 September 1996. However, when the first leg took place in Nouakchott two weeks later, he was an unused substitute under the name Francisco Obama Ondo and the date of birth 15 May 1996. In February 2015, he competed for Leones Vegetarianos FC at the 2015 CAF Confederation Cup, again under the name Francisco Obama Ondo, but with another date of birth: 10 November 1996.

His original name is Franklin Bama Yangoua, which he changed to Francisco Obama Ondo after moving to Equatorial Guinea in 2013 to play for Akonangui FC. After living there for one year, he was called up to the Equatorial Guinea national football team even though he had no ancestry from there nor had the means to have citizenship. The Confederation of African Football rules indicated that a player is required to be naturalized for at least five years before granted national team permission. He clandestinely managed to elude this until 2017.

Transfers

Arranged to be sold in May 2016, he was part of the 'mass exodus' of FC Cape Town in which they sold almost half their team.

References

External links
 

1996 births
Living people
Footballers from Yaoundé
Cameroonian footballers
Association football central defenders
F.C. Cape Town players
AS Vita Club players
Al-Ahli Club (Manama) players
Sitra Club players
National First Division players
Cameroonian expatriate footballers
Cameroonian expatriate sportspeople in South Africa
Expatriate soccer players in South Africa
Cameroonian expatriate sportspeople in the Democratic Republic of the Congo
Expatriate footballers in the Democratic Republic of the Congo
Cameroonian expatriate sportspeople in Bahrain
Expatriate footballers in Bahrain
Cameroonian emigrants to Equatorial Guinea
Naturalized citizens of Equatorial Guinea
Equatorial Guinea international footballers
Equatoguinean footballers
Akonangui FC players
Leones Vegetarianos FC players
Equatoguinean people of Cameroonian descent
Sportspeople of Cameroonian descent